Catherine E. de Vries is a Dutch political scientist. She is Dean of Diversity & Inclusion and Professor of Political Science at Bocconi University. She is known for her research on European politics, including political behaviour, comparative European politics and political economy. She is also a columnist for the Dutch newspaper Het Financieele Dagblad (Financial Times).

Starting in June 2020, she was the coordinator (along with Seth Jolly) of the EUROPOW (European Politics Online Workshop): weekly hour-long seminars about contemporary topics of related to European politics research and roundtables on current events.

In 2003, she obtained her M. A. in Political Science at  the University of Amsterdam.  She was awarded her PhD in Political Science from VU University Amsterdam in 2007. Since January 2020 she has been an  Associate Member at  Nuffield College, University of Oxford.

Selected publications 
De Vries, Catherine E. & Sara B. Hobolt, Sven-Oliver Proksch & Jonathan Slapin (2021) Foundations of European Politics: A Comparative Approach. Oxford University Press.

De Vries, Catherine E. & Sara B. Hobolt (2020) Political Entrepreneurship: The Rise of Challenger Parties in Europe. Princeton University Press.

De Vries, Catherine E. (2018) Euroscepticism and the Future of European Integration. Oxford University Press.

References 

Dutch political scientists
Living people
Women political scientists
Year of birth missing (living people)
Academic staff of Bocconi University
Vrije Universiteit Amsterdam alumni